Cagiva is an Italian motorcycle manufacturer. It was founded in 1950 by Giovanni Castiglioni in Varese, originally producing small metal components. Giovanni's sons, Claudio and Gianfranco Castiglioni, went into the motorcycle industry in 1978. The name is a portmanteau derived from the founder's name 'Giovanni Castiglioni' and the founding location, i.e. CAstiglioni GIovanni VArese.

In its history, Cagiva won races in Dakar and Motocross competitions, as well as in Grand Prix motorcycle racing.

History

In 1978, Cagiva entered the motorcycle business with two racing motorcycles ridden by Gianfranco Bonera and Marco Lucchinelli. In the same year it bought a factory in Varese's frazione of Schiranna from Aermacchi/AMF-Harley-Davidson and went into motorcycle production. By 1979 the company reached an annual production of 40,000 motorbikes, with eight models powered by two-stroke engines ranging from 125 cc to 350 cc.

Many of the Harley-Davidson models were continued in production as Cagivas, and the off-road motorcycle division was improved and expanded, eventually producing its own race-winning WMX series of motocross motorcycles.

In 1983 Cagiva also sourced Ducati four stroke v-twin engines from 350 cc to 1000 cc and entered the big displacement market. Cagiva bought Ducati in 1985, but kept the Ducati brand that was better recognized outside Italy. Ducati motorcycle production continued in Bologna, while the Varese-built Cagiva Ala Azzurra (sold under the name "Alazzurra", "Bluewing") and Elefant were introduced, both featuring Ducati engines.

Cagiva continued with strategic buyouts of Moto Morini and Husqvarna in 1987. In 1991 Cagiva also bought the trademarks for the MV Agusta brand.

In 1996, Cagiva accepted the offer by the Texas Pacific Group and sold the Ducati and Moto Morini brands. In 1999, for strategic purposes, the company was restructured. MV Agusta Motor become the main brand comprising Cagiva and Husqvarna.

In 2000, production of the Cagiva Roadster ended. In 2008, Harley-Davidson bought MV Agusta Motor, the parent company of Cagiva, thereby regaining some control of its old Aermacchi factory.

In October 2009, Harley-Davidson informed that it would put Cagiva up for sale. In the August of the following year, Cagiva was bought back by the son of the founder and former owner Claudio Castiglioni.

In 2012, production of new high engine capacity Mitos ended. Increasingly stringent environmental emission requirements and the concentration of resources on MV Agusta's F3 were cited as reasons. The last few Mito SP525s produced were white in colour, and personally signed by MV Agusta CEO Giovanni Castiglioni, thus ended the legacy of the Mito, alongside the end of the Raptors.

Racing

In the early 1980s, Cagiva began to manufacture dirt bikes and started a massive public relations program with the opening of its North American branch. It hired Ron Turner and Duane Summers to test and develop its bikes. Cagiva motocross bikes were characterized by their fast powerful engines and innovative features, such as the MX line that had only one spring in the front forks with one fork controlling rebound and the other compression.

500cc World Championship

At the end of the 1970s the company began campaigning the Grand Prix motorcycle racing circuit. Randy Mamola was its lead rider from 1988 to 1990, and he achieved Cagiva’s first podium result. It would also have some technical assistance from Yamaha. 
In 1991 it signed former world champion Eddie Lawson to its team. 
Lawson would claim the company's first victory when he won the 1992 Hungarian Grand Prix. John Kocinski would also win a Grand Prix on a Cagiva GP500 (C594), finishing third in the 1994 world championship.

Dakar Rally

In 1990 and 1994 the Italian rider Edi Orioli won the Dakar Rally on the Ducati-powered Cagiva Elefant.

Motocross World Championship
 125 cc class

Motocross World World Constructors champions
 125 cc class 
 1985, 1986, 1987

Italian Speed championship

Mini Moke

Cagiva bought BMCs design for the Mini Moke, manufacturing them in Portugal using British built engines from 1990 until 1993. Intending to transfer production to the Bologna factory early in 1995, the tooling for the Moke was transferred to Italy late in 1993, but production never restarted.

Models

Racing motorcycles

Road

Off road - enduro - trial

Adventure - dual sport

Moped and Scooter
 Cocis
 Prima 50 / Prima 75
 SuperCity 50 / SuperCity 75
 Mito 50
 W4 50 / W4 75
 Passing 50cc (Scooter)

See also 

List of Italian companies
List of motorcycle manufacturers

References

External links

 Official website
 Cagiva Heritage - Registro Storico Cagiva
 All Cagiva motorcycles since 1978
 Cagiva in Motorcycle Grand Prix racing

 
Motorcycle manufacturers of Italy
Italian brands
Vehicle manufacturing companies established in 1978
Italian companies established in 1950
MV Agusta